North American Rotorwerks Pitbull can refer to:
North American Rotorwerks Pitbull SS, single seat ultralight autogyro
North American Rotorwerks Pitbull Ultralight, single seat ultralight autogyro
North American Rotorwerks Pitbull II, two seat autogyro